The Amaravati River is the longest tributary of Kaveri River in the fertile districts of Udumalpet, Dharapuram and Karur Tamil Nadu state, South India.

Notes 
It descends in a northerly direction through Amaravathi Reservoir and Amaravathi Dam at Amaravathinagar. It is joined by the  Kallapuram River at the mouth of the Ajanda valley in Udumalaipettai.

Nanganji, Kudavanar, Shanmuga nadhi, Uppar, Kudumiar, Thenar and so many tributaries are joint with the Amravati river.  It has the Tributary of the Pambar and Chinnar rivers from Kerala also.

Use 
The Amaravathi Dam has 4 megawatts of electricity generating capacity installed. The Amaravathi River and its basin, especially in the vicinity of Karur, are heavily used for industrial processing water and waste disposal and as a result are severely polluted due to large amount of textile dyeing and bleaching units. But nowadays in karur, the changes are vicinity by seeing Amaravati river on its clean surface because of pollution controlled by government.

History 

The ancient names of the river is Aanporunai and Aambravathi. Amaravathi, invokes the greenery and Kalpavriksha tree of Lord Indra's heaven. The name Amaravathi echoes the Hindu past and present of southern India. By Hindu religion, river is from the grace of goddess Ambaal form the heaven.  The Amaravathi river swells into life in the Anjanad valley (Anaimalai, Kerala state) of the Western Ghats, whose slopes are awash with Kurinji blossoms once every 12 years, descends to the plains near Udumalaipettai, Tamil Nadu, and flows to make the rich plains of Dharapuram and Karur . It is one of the longest rivers (282 km) in Tamil Nadu,  which join with the river Cauvery, near Karur.

Gallery

Notes 

Rivers of Tamil Nadu
Tributaries of the Kaveri River
Geography of Coimbatore
Rivers of India